Felipe Luciano Fritz Saldías (born 23 September 1997) is a Chilean football player who plays as a forward for Curicó Unido on loan from Colo-Colo in the Chilean Primera División.

Club career
In 2021, he joined Chilean Primera División club Colo-Colo from Unión Española, but he was loaned to Curicó Unido in July of the same year.

International career
He was in the Chile U20 squad for the 2017 South American U-20 Championship, but he didn't make any appearance.

References

External links
 

1997 births
Living people
People from Coronel
People from Concepción Province, Chile
People from Biobío Region
Chilean footballers
Chile youth international footballers
Chile under-20 international footballers
Chilean Primera División players
Primera B de Chile players
Universidad de Concepción footballers
Cobreloa footballers
Rangers de Talca footballers
Unión Española footballers
Colo-Colo footballers
Curicó Unido footballers
Association football forwards